The men's 200 metres event at the 2008 World Junior Championships in Athletics was held in Bydgoszcz, Poland, at Zawisza Stadium on 10 and 11 July.

Medalists

Results

Final
11 July
Wind: -0.9 m/s

Semifinals
10 July

Semifinal 1
Wind: -0.9 m/s

Semifinal 2
Wind: -0.3 m/s

Semifinal 3
Wind: -0.1 m/s

Heats
10 July

Heat 1
Wind: +0.4 m/s

Heat 2
Wind: -0.7 m/s

Heat 3
Wind: +0.9 m/s

Heat 4
Wind: -1.1 m/s

Heat 5
Wind: -0.3 m/s

Heat 6
Wind: -0.2 m/s

Heat 7
Wind: -1.8 m/s

Heat 8
Wind: +0.4 m/s

Participation
According to an unofficial count, 58 athletes from 44 countries participated in the event.

References

200 metres
200 metres at the World Athletics U20 Championships